The Copper Coast Council is a local government area in the Australian state of South Australia located at the northern end of the Yorke Peninsula. It was established in 1997 and its seat is in Kadina.

Description
The Copper Coast Council is located at the northern end of Yorke Peninsula adjoining the coastline with Spencer Gulf between the settlement in Tickera in the north and the northern boundary of Nalyappa in the south.  The council seat is located at Kadina where its head office is located, while it maintains sub-offices at Moonta and Wallaroo.

A fourth settlement, Paskeville, is located on the Copper Coast Highway in the east of the local government area. The area's population counted at the 2016 census was 12,949.

History
The District Council of the Copper Coast was formed on 6 February 1997 through the amalgamation of the former District Council of Northern Yorke Peninsula and the Corporation of the Town of Wallaroo. In July 2017, the name was changed to the present designation.

Geography
The council includes the towns and localities of Boors Plain, Cross Roads, Cunliffe, East Moonta, Hamley, Jericho, Jerusalem, Kadina, Kooroona, Matta Flat, Moonta, Moonta Bay, Moonta Mines, New Town, North Beach, North Moonta, North Yelta, Paramatta, Port Hughes, Thrington, Wallaroo, Wallaroo Mines, Wallaroo Plain, Warburto, Willamulka and Yelta, and parts of Paskeville and Tickera.

Councillors
The Copper Coast Council has a directly elected mayor.

Mayors
 William Ivan Oates (1997–2000) 
 Paul Thomas (2000–2018) 
 Roslyn Talbot (current)

See also
 Kernewek Lowender- the biennial Copper Coast festival celebrating the local Cornish heritage
 Yorke Peninsula Field Days
 List of parks and gardens in rural South Australia

References

External links
 
 

Local government areas of South Australia